Gustavo Ariel Toranzo (born 15 September 1987) is an Argentine professional footballer who plays as a defender.

Career
 Arsenal de Sarandí 2010–2011
 2 de Mayo 2012
 San Martín de San Juan 2012–2013
 Arsenal de Sarandí 2010–2011
 Atlético Tucumán 2012–2013
 Defensores de Belgrano 2010–2011
 Sportivo Carapeguá 2013–2014
 General Díaz 2014
 Everton 2015–present

References
 
 

1987 births
Living people
Argentine footballers
Footballers from Buenos Aires
Association football defenders
Primera B de Chile players
Defensores de Belgrano footballers
San Martín de San Juan footballers
Arsenal de Sarandí footballers
Atlético Tucumán footballers
2 de Mayo footballers
General Díaz footballers
Sportivo Carapeguá footballers
Everton de Viña del Mar footballers
Club Sol de América footballers
All Boys footballers
Platense F.C. players
Club Atlético Fénix players
Club Atlético Temperley footballers
Argentine expatriate footballers
Argentine expatriate sportspeople in Chile
Expatriate footballers in Chile
Argentine expatriate sportspeople in Paraguay
Expatriate footballers in Paraguay